Haunts of the Very Rich is a 1972 made-for-TV  thriller, broadcast as an ABC Movie of the Week.

Plot
A group of rich tourists and business people fly to a mysterious tropical resort, the Portals of Eden, hosted by Seacrist. There, they spend their time relaxing and being pampered in paradise. Following a powerful storm after their first night, the guests suddenly find themselves all alone, with dwindling food and water, without communication with the outside world, and abandoned by the resort staff. The guests discover they have each recently experienced a brush with death, and they try to determine what it means. Dave had had a heart attack. Ellen a fatal reaction to a rabies vaccine. Annette was given unfamiliar sleeping pills by her husband. Lyle and Laurie had been in a car accident. Reverend Fellows had drowned. Al reluctantly realizes he may have fallen down some stairs while drunk. Conditions continue to deteriorate and some come to believe that they are in Hell. As time passes, they receive clues about their fate. First, a seaplane lands to answer their distress call and the pilot assures them he will send help, although he cannot take any of them to safety. The group is elated but Laurie is depressed because she recognizes the pilot as Johnny Delmonico, a singer who had been recently reported in the news as having died in a plane crash. A second seaplane arrives later and the pilot explains that the storm was a hurricane and he had been held up with urgent relief efforts. The guests happily pack their bags to leave but return to find the plane gone, although there had been no engine noise. They realize that in this Hell, they are repeatedly given hope then have it taken away. Dave finds his own hopes of life with Ellen dashed when his clingy wife appears, apparently having committed suicide because she couldn't bear to be without him.

Cast

Production notes
Haunts of the Very Rich was filmed around the Miami, Florida area, with the resort scenes filmed at Villa Vizcaya.

See also
 List of American films of 1972

External links
 
 Film Threat Bootleg Files: "Haunts of the Very Rich"
 Film summary at Fandango.com

1972 television films
1972 films
1970s psychological thriller films
ABC Movie of the Week
ABC Motion Pictures films
Films shot in Miami
Films directed by Paul Wendkos
American psychological thriller films
1970s English-language films
1970s American films